Jackson Bay is a settlement in British Columbia.  It lies on a northerly inlet from Johnstone Strait north of Hardwicke Island.  It is within Topaze Harbour, a good anchorage for ships.

There was at least one First Nations village (of the Kwakwakaʼwakw) on the site.  Ethnic European settlers arrived from the 1910s onwards beginning with a boat landing location and a general store.  Logging and fishing were the main occupations, along with supporting agriculture, until the 1950s when the settlement was abandoned.

References

Settlements in British Columbia